Brunia noduliflora, commonly called the cone stompie in English or  in Afrikaans, is an evergreen shrub native to South Africa.

Description
Brunia noduliflora has a woody rootstock from which many stems sprout. Their ericoid leaves are stalkless and resemble triangular or lance-shaped overlapping scales. Their spherical, cream inflorescences have long stamens, giving them a "fluffy" appearance. These flowers are short-lived, but their globose grey-brown seedheads are more persistent.

Range
Brunia noduliflora is endemic to the southern and southwestern Cape of Africa. It is common from the Olifants River Mountains to Piketberg, the Cape Peninsula, Jonkershoek, Hottentots Holland Mountains, and the Kogelberg through to the Hermanus and Elim. It can also be found around the Van Stadens Mountains and around Uitenhage.

Habitat
This shrub is found on hills and rocky sandstone slopes.

Ecology
Brunia noduliflora is endemic to fynbos grassland where periodic fires are common. A fire-adapted plant, it has two strategies for surviving fires - reseeding and resprouting. Its underground woody rootstock, or lignotuber, resprouts the following year during autumn, while seeds retained in its seedheads are dispersed after being released by burning.

Etymology
The generic name Brunia may honor either Dr. Cornelius Brun, an apothecary and contemporary of Linnaeus, or the ship surgeon and botanical collector Dr. Alexander Brown. The specific epithet noduliflora is derived from Latin and describes its flowering habit - "nodulus" meaning "knot" and "flos" meaning flower - thus, "knotted flowers".

Taxonomy

Horticulture
B. noduliflora, being a serotinous plant, requires special treatment of its seeds to simulate post-fire conditions in order to germinate. Cuttings from its stems can also be propagated. It is best planted in well-draining fynbos gardens with acidic soil.

Uses
It is sometimes used in floral arrangement for its unusual seedheads and long-lasting foliage. It is available under the trade name "Spray Brunia".

References 

Bruniaceae
Flora of the Cape Provinces
Flora of KwaZulu-Natal
Plants described in 2000